Lemuel Jenkins (October 20, 1789 – August 18, 1862) was an American lawyer and politician from New York.

Life
Jenkins was born in Bloomingburgh, then Ulster County, now Sullivan County, New York, the posthumous son of Lemuel Jenkins (1740–1789), originally of Edgartown, Massachusetts, and his third wife Mary (Dunham) Jenkins (1759–1809). He was admitted to the bar in October 1815, and practiced in Bloomingburgh. He was District Attorney of Sullivan County from 1818 to 1819. On May 13, 1819, he married Gertrude Pearson Huyck, and their children were Leonine Jenkins (1820–1849), Mary Elizabeth (Jenkins) McGill (born 1821) and Charles Edward Jenkins (born 1822).

Jenkins was elected as a Crawford Democratic-Republican to the 18th United States Congress, holding office from March 4, 1823, to March 3, 1825. Afterwards he removed to Albany, and resumed the practice of law there. On September 17, 1832, he married his second wife Elizabeth Tracy Kidd.

He died in Albany, New York, and was buried at Albany Rural Cemetery in Menands, New York.

His son Charles E. Jenkins removed to Milwaukee in 1848, was a member of the Wisconsin State Assembly in 1850 and 1851, and Judge of the Milwaukee County Court from 1854 to 1856.

External links

The New York Civil List compiled by Franklin Benjamin Hough (pages 71 and 448; Weed, Parsons and Co., 1858)
The Ladies' Literary Cabinet (edition of June 26, 1819; page 56)
Jenkins genealogy at RootsWeb
Dunham genealogy (badly transcribed e-book)

1789 births
1862 deaths
People from Sullivan County, New York
Politicians from Albany, New York
Burials at Albany Rural Cemetery
Sullivan County district attorneys
Democratic-Republican Party members of the United States House of Representatives from New York (state)
19th-century American politicians
Lawyers from Albany, New York
19th-century American lawyers